Colors is the fifth studio album by the Swedish singer-songwriter Laleh, released on 16 October 2013. Produced by Laleh herself, the album was released on Warner Music Sweden and Lost Army. The album is, as usual, produced, written, recorded, engineered and performed by Laleh.

Track listing 
"Speaking of Truth" – 4:23
"Colors" – 3:37
"Sway" – 3:28
"Dark Shadow" – 3:08
"Stars Align" – 3:27
"Wish I Could Stay" – 3:45
"Return to the Soil" – 4:32
"Goliat" – 4:07
"En stund på jorden" – 3:53
"Solen och dagen" – 4:21

Charts

Weekly charts

Year-end charts

References

External links
 Laleh official website

2013 albums
Laleh (singer) albums
Warner Music Group albums